Great Bend, Kansas  is a city in and the county seat of Barton County, Kansas.

Great Bend may also refer to

United States 
Great Bend Township, Barton County, Kansas
Great Bend Township, Cottonwood County, Minnesota
Great Bend, New York
Great Bend, North Dakota
Great Bend, Pennsylvania
Great Bend Township, Susquehanna County, Pennsylvania

Canada 
Rural Municipality of Great Bend No. 405, Saskatchewan

Other uses
Great Bend of the Nile

See also
Big Bend (disambiguation)